Luis Alberto Lozoya Mendoza (born April 10, 1993) is a Mexican professional footballer who plays for Liga MX club Tijuana.

External links
 

1993 births
Living people
Association football defenders
Santos Laguna footballers
Irapuato F.C. footballers
Club Celaya footballers
C.D. Veracruz footballers
Alebrijes de Oaxaca players
Liga MX players
Ascenso MX players
Liga Premier de México players
Tercera División de México players
Footballers from Coahuila
Mexican footballers